"Englishman in New York" is a song by English singer-songwriter Sting, from his second studio album ...Nothing Like the Sun, released in October 1987. Branford Marsalis played soprano saxophone on the track, while the drums were played by Manu Katché and the percussion by Mino Cinélu.

The single was released in February 1988 as the third single from the album, but only reached No. 51 on the UK Singles Chart. In the US, "Englishman in New York" peaked at No. 84 on the Billboard Hot 100 chart in April 1988 and reached No. 32 on the Billboard Mainstream Rock chart that same month. However, the single was more successful in continental Europe, becoming a hit in several countries, reaching the top 40 in France, the Netherlands, Spain, and Belgium. "Englishman in New York" was also a top 20 hit in Ireland. In South Africa, it peaked at No. 9.

In 1990, just prior to the release of his third studio album The Soul Cages, Sting's record label licensed Dutch DJ and producer Ben Liebrand to remix "Englishman in New York" and subsequently released it as a single. The remix played around with the introduction and some of the instrumentation, but the essence of the song remained the same. The new version was commercially successful, reaching number 15 in the UK charts in mid-1990.

In 2010, Sting re-recorded the song in an orchestral version for his album Symphonicities.

"Englishman/African in New York", a reworking of the song recorded with African artist Shirazee was released as a non-album digital-only single on 19 March 2021. Shirazee had previously covered the song as "African in New York" with Sting's approval. Sting and Shirazee released a music video and performed the song on ABC's Good Morning America.

Content
Sting wrote the song about the famous eccentric and gay icon Quentin Crisp, who is the "Englishman" of the title. The song was composed not long after Crisp had moved from London to an apartment in the Bowery in Manhattan. Sting had met him and Crisp remarked jokingly to the musician that he "looked forward to receiving his naturalisation papers so that I can commit a crime and not be deported." When Sting asked him what kind of crime, he answered, "Something glamorous, non-violent, with a dash of style. Crime is so rarely glamorous these days." Sting included this story in the liner notes of his album ...Nothing Like The Sun.

Musical content
The song is composed in the key of B-minor.  It is mainly the same chord progression throughout the song (except in the bridge): Em - A - Bm. The functions in the key of the chords are iv - VII - i. The soprano saxophone that plays over the song mainly plays the minor scale in Bm.

In the bridge the chords change to D - A - Bm - F#, G - A - F# - Bm. This corresponds with III - VII - i - V,  VI - VII - V - i.

Music video
The video was shot in black-and-white and was directed by David Fincher, and featured scenes of Sting and his band in New York (primarily Branford Marsalis playing sax), as well as the elusive Quentin Crisp. At the end of the video, after the song fades, an elderly male voice says: "If I have an ambition other than a desire to be a chronic invalid, it would be to meet everybody in the world before I die... and I'm not doing badly." In 2011, the official video was replaced with a version without the male voice.

Track listing
 12" Single (AMY 431)
"Englishman in New York" – 4:25
"Ghost in the Strand" – 2:33
"Bring on the Night"/"When the World Is Running Down" (Live) – 11:42

 7" Single (AM 1200)
"Englishman in New York" – 4:25
"If You There" – 4:08

 CD Maxi Single (75021 2370 2)
"Englishman in New York" – 4:03
"Someone to Watch Over Me" – 4:35
"Up from the Skies" – 10:07

Charts and certifications

Weekly charts

1990 remix

Certifications

Cris Cab version
In 2015, American singer Cris Cab covered the song featuring Tefa & Moox, and Willy William. This version charted on the French SNEP Top Singles chart, reaching number 16, and also on the Belgian Wallonia Ultratop singles chart at No. 34.

Other versions 
In 1993, the song was partially remade by Shinehead, re-titled as "Jamaican in New York" (1993). It reached No. 30 on the UK Singles Chart in April 1993.
In 1998, Venezuelan band King Chango covered the song as "Venezuelan in New York" for the various artists tribute release Outlandos d’Americas - Tributo a Police (A Tribute to the Police). The instrumental sections in the song were re-worked using Latin rhythms such as cumbia and dancehall.
In 2015, Japanese singer Majiko released a cover as a bonus track on her single "Mirror".

Notes

References

1987 songs
1988 singles
1990 singles
Sting (musician) songs
Quentin Crisp
Songs about New York City
Songs written by Sting (musician)
Music videos directed by David Fincher
Black-and-white music videos
The Flying Pickets songs
Reggae fusion songs
A&M Records singles